Rivers State Dental and Maxillofacial Hospital (RSDMH) situated in Garrison, Port Harcourt, is a Nigerian specialist hospital opened in 2013 to provide dental, oral and maxillofacial services to the general public. The hospital is owned by the Rivers State government and is considered the first of its kind in Sub-Saharan Africa.

The hospital is one of the major health facilities in the state that is managed by the International Trauma and Care Centre (ITCC). Its building is four stories high.

See also
List of hospitals in Port Harcourt

References

External links

Dental and Maxillofacial Hospital
Dental and Maxillofacial Hospital
Dental and Maxillofacial Hospital
2012 establishments in Nigeria
2010s establishments in Rivers State
21st-century architecture in Nigeria